Trichomonadidae is a family of anaerobic protozoa. Many of its members are parasitic, causing disease in humans or domestic animals.

References

Excavata families